Aliabad (also Romanized as ‘Alīābād; also known as Darreh Kāvolī) is a village in Abanar Rural District, Kalat District, Abdanan County, Ilam Province, Iran. The 2006 census reported its population as 60 citizens between 14 families. The village is populated by Lurs.

References 

Populated places in Abdanan County
Luri settlements in Ilam Province